The second and final season of the television series Dollhouse premiered on September 25, 2009, on Fox and concluded its 13-episode season on January 29, 2010. The season aired on Fridays at 9:00 pm ET.

Cast and characters

Main cast 
 Eliza Dushku as Echo/Caroline Farrell
 Harry Lennix as Boyd Langton (Does not appear in "Instinct" and "Epitaph Two: Return")
 Fran Kranz as Topher Brink
 Tahmoh Penikett as Paul Ballard (Does not appear in "Belonging, "The Left Hand" and "Stop-Loss")
 Enver Gjokaj as Victor/Anthony Ceccoli (Does not appear in "Instinct" and "The Public Eye")
 Dichen Lachman as Sierra/Priya Tsetsang (Does not appear in "Belle Chose", "The Public Eye" and "The Left Hand")
 Olivia Williams as Adelle DeWitt

Recurring cast 
 Liza Lapira as Ivy (6 episodes)
 Miracle Laurie as Mellie/November/Madelaine Costley (5 episodes)
 Alexis Denisof as Senator Daniel Perrin (4 episodes)
 Summer Glau as Bennett Halverson (4 episodes)
 Amy Acker as Dr. Claire Saunders/Whiskey (3 episodes)
 Keith Carradine as Matthew Harding (3 episodes)
 Stacey Scowley as Cindy Perrin (3 episodes)
 Maurissa Tancharoen as Kilo (3 episodes)
 Philip Casnoff as Clive Ambrose (2 episodes)
 Reed Diamond as Laurence Dominic (2 episodes)
 Alan Tudyk as Alpha (2 episodes)
 Vincent Ventresca as Nolan Kinnard (2 episodes)
 Brett Claywell as Matt Cargill (1 episode)
 Felicia Day as Mag (1 episode)
 Patton Oswalt as Joel Mynor (1 episode)
 Adair Tishler as Little Caroline (1 episode)
 Zack Ward as Zone (1 episode)

Episodes

Production 
Fox renewed Dollhouse for a second season, although the show received a dramatic budget cut. For this reason, four out of the seven lead actors do not appear in every episode of the season. Harry Lennix and Enver Gjokaj are both absent from two, while Tahmoh Penikett and Dichen Lachman are both absent from three. Amy Acker, whom Joss Whedon had intended to be a prominent component of the season, only appeared in three episodes due to the budget cut and her commitment to the short lived series, Happy Town.

The series upgraded from 35 mm film to HD digital film for this season and shot much of the footage using hand held cameras, in the style of "Epitaph One". Joss Whedon, creator of the show, states on his audio commentary for "Vows" that shooting went so much faster than usual, due in part to the use of HD cameras and hand held direction, that his line producer, Kelly Manners, would often be; "scrambling for something to do."

The show also acquired a new cinematographer for the season, Lisa Wiegand, who removed much of the over head lighting present in the first season to give the series a more cinematic look.

Whedon had originally intended to film scenes of the apocalyptic future from "Epitaph One" throughout the season but under the opinion of both the studio and network decided to drop the idea—instead having the series finale be entirely set in said storyline. He in fact filmed scenes starring the three actors (Felicia Day, Zack Ward and Adair Tishler) for the first episode but these were later added to the beginning of "Epitaph Two: Return" because, as Whedon notes; "We didn't have the money to shoot an entire episode."

Fox failed to air the series during November "sweeps period" and instead aired back to back episodes of the series for the first three weeks in December ending with episode ten "The Attic". This decision sparked rumor amongst fans and critics that Fox was indeed intending to cancel the show (a threat present since the first season) and despite an increase in critical acclaim throughout the season, Fox canceled the show after the fourth episode aired, citing declining ratings as the reason.

The remaining three episodes aired in January with the series finale held back a week due to the Hope for Haiti charity telethon.

Crew 
Series creator Joss Whedon continued to serve as executive producer and showrunner. Michelle Fazekas and Tara Butters joined as consulting producers, replacing Elizabeth Craft and Sarah Fain, and wrote the second and penultimate episodes of the show; "Instinct" and "The Hollow Men". Whedon wrote and directed the season premiere "Vows" but is not credited with either writing or directing any other episode of the show. Tim Minear, promoted to executive producer, again wrote two episodes ("Belle Chose" and "Getting Closer") and directed the latter. Tracey Bellomo and Andrew Chambliss remained with the show and were promoted to story editors. Each wrote or co-wrote two and four episodes respectively while Maurissa Tancharoen and Jed Whedon (also promoted to story editors) wrote or co-wrote the remainder of the episodes including; "Belonging", "Meet Jane Doe", "The Attic" and the series finale "Epitaph Two: Return". Jenny DeArmit, the writer's assistant during the first season, wrote the episode "A Love Supreme".

David Solomon was promoted to executive producer and again directed the highest number of episodes of the season, directing three out of the thirteen including the series finale. Comic book artist John Cassaday, who has worked closely with Whedon when he wrote the Astonishing X-Men arc for Marvel Comics, directed the tenth episode of the season. Other directors included Marita Grabiak, Jonathan Frakes, Wendey Stanzler, David Straiton, Felix Alcalá, Terrence O'Hara and Dwight Little.

Eliza Dushku and Kelly A. Manners again acted as producer and line producer respectively. 

Ross Berryman, who was the show's cinematographer for the first season, was replaced by Lisa Wiegand.

Home video releases 
Dollhouse: Season Two was released on DVD and Blu-ray in region 1 on October 12, 2010 and in region 2 October 11, 2010. It includes all 13 episodes on a 4-disc DVD set and a 3-disc Blu-ray set presented in anamorphic widescreen 1.78:1 aspect ratio. Special features include three commentary tracks—"Vows" by Joss Whedon; "Belonging" by Maurissa Tancharoen and Jed Whedon; and "Getting Closer" by Tim Minear, which is Blu-ray exclusive. Featurettes include, "Defining Moments", a look at the second season; and "Looking Back", a discussion with Joss Whedon and several cast members as they reminisce about the show. Also included are series outtakes and deleted scenes from various episodes.

References

External links 
 
 

2009 American television seasons
2010 American television seasons